Europium(III) chloride is an inorganic compound with the formula EuCl3.  The anhydrous compound is a yellow solid. Being hygroscopic it rapidly absorbs water to form a white crystalline hexahydrate, EuCl3·6H2O, which is colourless. The compound is used in research.

Preparation
Treating Eu2O3 with aqueous HCl produces hydrated europium chloride (EuCl3·6H2O). This salt cannot be rendered anhydrous by heating.  Instead one obtains an oxychloride.
Anhydrous EuCl3 is often prepared by the "ammonium chloride route," starting from either Eu2O3 or hydrated europium chloride (EuCl3·6H2O) by heating carefully to 230 °C. These methods produce (NH4)2[EuCl5]:

10 NH4Cl  +  Eu2O3  →  2 (NH4)2[EuCl5]  +  6 NH3 + 3 H2O

EuCl3·6H2O + 2 NH4Cl → (NH4)2[EuCl5] + 6 H2O

The pentachloride decomposes thermally according to the following equation:
 (NH4)2[EuCl5]   →   2 NH4Cl  +  EuCl3
The thermolysis reaction proceeds via the intermediary of (NH4)[Eu2Cl7].

Reactions
Europium(III) chloride is a precursor to other europium compounds. It can be converted to the corresponding metal bis(trimethylsilyl)amide via salt metathesis with lithium bis(trimethylsilyl)amide. The reaction is performed in THF and requires a period at reflux.

 EuCl3 + 3 LiN(SiMe3)2   →  Eu(N(SiMe3)2)3 + 3 LiCl

Eu(N(SiMe3)2)3 is a starting material for the more complicated coordination complexes.

Reduction with hydrogen gas with heating gives EuCl2. The latter has been used to prepare organometallic compounds of europium(II), such as bis(pentamethylcyclopentadienyl)europium(II) complexes. Europium(III) chloride can be used as a starting point for the preparation of other europium salts.

Structure
In the solid state, it crystallises in the UCl3 motif.  The Eu centres are nine-coordinate.

Bibliography

References

Chlorides
Europium(III) compounds
Lanthanide halides